Alberto Villalpando (born 21 November 1940, in La Paz) is a Bolivian composer.

Biography
Villalpando began his musical training in Potosí under Santiago Velásquez and Padre José Díaz Gainza. From 1958 he studied at the Conservatory of Buenos Aires with Alberto Ginastera, Pedro Sáenz, Abraham Jurafsky and Roberto García Morillo, and in 1963–64 at the Latin American Center for Higher Musical Studies (CLAEM) in Buenos Aires with Olivier Messiaen, Riccardo Malipiero, Luigi Dallapiccola, Alberto Ginastera, Bruno Maderna and Aaron Copland. There, in collaboration with Miguel Angel Rondano, he developed a sound installation for an exhibition of the painter Carlos Squirru.

In 1964 he became head of the State Film Institute of Bolivia, and in 1967 was appointed director of the Music Department of the Bolivian Ministry of Culture. In addition, he served as professor of composition and director of the National Conservatory of La Paz and the music seminar of the Universidad Católica Boliviana and was Bolivian cultural attaché to France. In 1998 he was awarded the National Prize for Bolivian Culture.

In addition to orchestral works such as Phantastischen Liturgie, Strukturen (for piano and orchestra), and Von der Liebe, der Furcht und dem Schweigen (for piano and chamber orchestra), he composed ballet and film music, works for chamber orchestra, and Sonnengesang for soloists, choir and orchestra. While studying electroacoustic music, he benefited from the tape recorder, producing Bolivianos...! in Leo Küpper's recording studio. Later he drew on electroacoustic sound and the technical developments offered by MIDI.

Works 
Five Preludes for solo piano, 1960
La Muerte for tape, 1964
Mística No. 3 for two string quartets, horn, flute, double bass and tape, 1970
Mística No. 4 for string quartet, piano and tape, 1970
Bolivianos...! for tape, 1973
Yamar y Armor, ballet music for voice, tape and orchestra, after Blanca Wiethüchter, 1975
Desde el Jardín de Morador for MIDI, 1990
Transformaciones del agua y del fuego en las montanas for orchestra 1991
De los Elementos for MIDI, 1991
Manchaypuytu, opera, 1995
Qantatai for choir, narrator and electronic sounds, 1996
La Lagarta, ballet for narrator and elektroakustische sounds, after Blanca Wiethüchter, 2002
Piano 3 for piano and two piano synthesizers, 2002
Mística 10 for viola profonda and piano, 2009 
Los diálogos de Tunupa for viola profonda and string orchestra, 2011

References

External links 
Alberto Villalpando La foundation Daniel Langlois
Alberto Villalpando Colegio de Compositores Latinoamericanos de Música de Arte

Bolivian composers
Bolivian male musicians
Male composers
1940 births
Living people
People from La Paz